Tip O'Neill (1912–1994) was an American politician.

Tip O'Neill may also refer to:

Tip O'Neill (baseball) (1858–1915), Canadian baseball player
Tip O'Neill (American football) (1898–1984), American football player in the National Football League

See also
Tip O'Neill Award, a baseball award named in honor of the baseball player
O'Neill (surname)